The white-naped jay (Cyanocorax cyanopogon) is a species of bird in the family Corvidae. It is endemic to Brazil - where it is known as the Gralha Cancã or the Cancão. Its natural habitats are subtropical or tropical dry forest and subtropical or tropical moist lowland forest.

References

Cyanocorax
Birds of Brazil
Birds of the Caatinga
Endemic birds of Brazil
Birds described in 1821
Taxonomy articles created by Polbot